York, also known as York Valley, is a census-designated place in Greenlee County, Arizona, United States. As of the 2010 census, the population was 557.

Most residents work for Freeport-McMoRan at the Morenci Mine northwest of Clifton. The major housing is in trailer homes. York is also close to the Greenlee County Airport and is home to the Greenlee County Country Club.

Demographics

References

Census-designated places in Greenlee County, Arizona